Bartłomiej Świderski (born 7 March 1973 in Wrocław, Poland) is a Polish actor and singer. He was the vocalist of the former group Grejfrut, and has now embarked on a solo singing career.

Świderski attended the Bolesław Chrobry High School in Bielawa, following which he graduated from Lart studiO acting school in Kraków in 1994 and the National Film School in Łódź in 1998.

Filmography 
 2016-2017: Druga szansa as Marcin Kryński, Monika's partner
 2007-2008: Tylko miłość as Rafał Rozner, a single father
 2006: Fala zbrodni as Ernest von Stein
 2006: Kryminalni as Dominik Czerny vel Zaleski
 2005-2007: Magda M. as Sebastian Lewicki
 2005: Zakochany Anioł as Paweł
 2005: 1409. Afera na zamku Bartenstein as Eryk
 2004: Cud w Krakowie (Csoda Krakkóban) as Aurel
 2002: Break Point
 2002-2003: Kasia i Tomek  as Irek, Kasia's ex-boyfriend (voice only)
 2002: Sfora as informer
 2002-2006: Samo Życie as Leszek Retman
 2001: Avalon as Stunner
 2001: Marszałek Piłsudski as Bronisław Piłsudski, Józef's brother
 1999: Ostatnia misja as a policeman
 1999: Prawo Ojca as Commissar Orłowski
 1999: Jak narkotyk as Marta's acquaintance
 1995: Młode wilki as a border guard

Discography

Studio albums

Music videos

References

External links
Official website

Living people
1973 births
Polish male actors
Mystic Production artists
Polish pop singers
20th-century Polish male singers
21st-century Polish male singers
21st-century Polish singers